Kapillayuq (Quechua  chapel (a borrowing from Spanish capilla), -yuq a suffix to indicate ownership, "the one with a chapel", also spelled Capillayoc) is a  mountain in the Andes of Peru. It is located in the Junín Region, Huancayo Province, Chongos Alto District. Kapillayuq lies east of Walsa and west of the lake named Ñawinqucha.

References

Mountains of Junín Region
Mountains of Peru